Robert James "Bob" Eaton (born 13 February 1940) is an American businessman, who was Chairman and former CEO of Chrysler Corporation.

Early life

Eaton was born in Buena Vista, Colorado and grew up in Arkansas City, Kansas. He graduated with a B.S. degree in mechanical engineering from the University of Kansas in 1963. He was in the Kappa Sigma Fraternity.

Career
Upon graduation he joined General Motors and in 1973 he was made chief engineer of GM's new front wheel drive X-body cars. In 1982 he was promoted to vice-president of advanced engineering before being named president of GM Europe in 1988. It was here that Chrysler Corporation CEO Lee Iacocca found Eaton and hired him to be his successor as CEO. This was controversial at the time, because Bob Lutz was the expected successor to the CEO position, and Iacocca later indicated that he indeed felt that Lutz would have been the better choice as his successor.

Eaton was the Chairman and CEO of Chrysler from 1993 until 1998. In that position, he was responsible for the sale of Chrysler Corporation to Daimler-Benz, which formed DaimlerChrysler.

Eaton was elected as a member into the National Academy of Engineering (NAE) in 1989 for leading design and development of modern front-wheel-drive, body-frame-integral automobiles and for introducing advanced automotive manufacturing techniques. He was also a chairman of the NAE. 

He was elected a director of Chevron in September 2000. 

He has been on the board of International Paper. He is a trustee of the University of Kansas Endowment Association. , he lives in Naples, Florida, with his wife, Connie.

Awards
1994 Distinguished Service Citation from the University of Kansas Alumni Association.
1994 Man of the Year from the Kappa Sigma Fraternity.
1995 Distinguished Engineering Service Award from the University of Kansas School of Engineering.
1995 Golden Plate Award of the American Academy of Achievement.
2005 Inducted into the University of Kansas Business Hall of Fame

References

External links
"Engineering building christened Eaton Hall"

1940 births
Living people
Chrysler executives
Directors of Chevron Corporation
Members of the United States National Academy of Engineering

20th-century American businesspeople
University of Kansas alumni
Automotive businesspeople
Chrysler people